Eight Tales is a collection of stories by British writer Walter de la Mare.  It was released in 1971 and was the author's first collection of stories published by Arkham House.  It was published in an edition of 2,992 copies.  The stories were all written under de la Mare's pseudonym "Walter Ramal" and had not appeared previously in book form.

Contents
Eight Tales contains an introduction, by Edward Wagenknecht, and the following stories:
 "Kismet"
 "The Hangman Luck"
 "A Mote"
 "The Village of Old Age"
 "The Moon's Miracle"
 "The Giant"
 "De Mortuis"
 "A:B:O."

Sources

External links 

1971 short story collections
Fantasy short story collections
Horror short story collections
Works published under a pseudonym
Works by Walter de la Mare
Arkham House books